The Prince's Mayday Network is a group of businesses committed to taking
action on climate change and was founded by Charles III in
2007.
The Network is convened by Business in the Community and over 3500 businesses have signed up to date. The 'May Day' name is derived from the May Day distress signal, and was chosen deliberately to communicate the urgency of the climate change message

The Prince's Mayday Summit

2007 Summit

The first Prince's Mayday Summit on climate change took place on 1 May 2007.
It was held as a call to action on the urgent issue of climate change. Over
1,000 business leaders made over 5,500 pledges to take action on climate change
at the event.

The Summit networked one hub event at St. James's Palace and nine
regional events across England through video conferencing technology. Companies discussed the science behind climate change and the business
imperative of taking action on the issue, with contributions from the Prince
of Wales, Jonathon Porritt and Crispin Tickell.

This initial event was followed by 2 further Summits in Scotland and Wales in
November 2007.

2008 Summit

The second Prince's Mayday Summit was held on 1 May 2008. Over 1,600
business leaders attended the Summit at 12 locations across the UK which were
linked by satellite to a 'hub' event attended by 160 Chief Executives of leading
businesses. Attendees were asked to commit to up to 6 pledges on climate change.
Nearly 7,000 pledges were made on the day and:
 76% of attendees committed to calculate their carbon footprint over the next 12 months
 60% of attendees committed to report their carbon footprint over the next 12 months

2009 Summit

The third Prince's Mayday Summit attracted over 1700 delegates, with another 300 watching it live online  and included contributions from Pen Hadow, Ed Miliband, John Ashton and Stuart Rose.

Mayday Journey

Since 2009, the focus of Mayday has moved away from annual events to being what it terms an everyday organisation. A major part of this is the Mayday Journey. The Mayday Journey is an online resource that combines a carbon calculator with guidance designed to help companies develop a carbon strategy.  The Journey is divided into four areas: reducing cost, engaging employees, suppliers and customers, building resilience through biodiversity and adaptation and developing a vision, termed transform.

Mayday case studies

Businesses in the Prince's May Day Network are encouraged to take action on climate change by sharing best practice through publishing case studies of best practice.  Over 150 companies have provided case studies, including Adnams Brewery, BT Group and Unipart.

Mayday report-back

Every year, the Prince of Wales requests that every business in the
Prince's May Day Network report-back on the progress they have made against
their May Day pledges in the May Day report-back.  Over 300 businesses reported back in 2011, which formed the basis for an annual report of members activity.

References

External links
 May Day Network
 May Day journey case studies
 May Day news
 Prince's 'mayday' climate alert BBC.co.uk

Environmental organisations based in the United Kingdom
Charles III